Deirdre Anne "Dee" Forbes (born 1 February 1967) has been the Director-General of RTÉ since April 2016. She is the first woman to hold the role, and the first external appointment in almost 50 years. Prior to joining RTÉ, she was President & Managing Director of Discovery Networks Northern Europe.

Personal life 

Forbes comes from Drimoleague, County Cork, where her parents ran the East End bar. Forbes attended national school in the village, before going to boarding school in Clonakilty. She then went on to study history and politics at University College Dublin. Soon after graduating from UCD, she moved to the UK in 1989, beginning her career with advertising agency Young and Rubicam.

References 

1967 births
Living people
Directors-General of RTÉ
Irish women in business